Maurice Rioli, Jr. (born 1 September 2002) is a professional Australian rules footballer who plays for the Richmond Football Club in the Australian Football League (AFL)

Early life, junior football and state-league football
Rioli is the namesake and son of former Richmond and South Fremantle player and Australian Football Hall of Fame member Maurice Rioli. He grew up in Pirlangimpi on Melville Island, among the Tiwi Islands of the Northern Territory alongside relatives including his (older) nephew and eventual Richmond player Daniel Rioli.

He first attended high school at St John's Catholic College in Darwin. Rioli showed the strongest links to Richmond during his early teenage years, regularly visiting the club where his nephew Daniel Rioli was drafted in 2015.

He represented the Northern Territory as a 14-year-old at the 2017 AFL Under-16s Championships where he was a regular goalkicker. Later that year he made his senior football debut, playing for St Mary's in the Northern Territory Football League.

Rioli relocated to Melbourne in early 2018 where he boarded at Scotch College. He played football for the school that year, as well as once again representing the Territory at the Under 16s Championships.

After another summer season with St Mary's, Rioli returned to Melbourne in 2019 where he joined the squad of the Oakleigh Chargers, though would not earn a top-flight NAB League match during that his 'underage' year. Instead, he played NAB League football as part of a representative Northern Territory representative side.

For a third straight season, Rioli played for St Mary's in the 2019/20 summer and into early autumn, ahead of his final year of underage football. He played nine games in the season, with his most impressive performance coming with a best-on-ground  four goals in a semi-final win, before adding one goal in St Mary's losing grand final showing the following week. That same summer he trained with the AFL squad at Richmond as part of the club's father-son program for which he would be eligible at the coming draft. Rioli intended to play school football with Scotch and with Oakleigh in the NAB League that year, but ultimately each league's season was cancelled along with the AFL Under 18 Championships as a result of public health restrictions imposed in response to the COVID-19 pandemic.

AFL recruitment
In September 2020, Rioli was one of 96 players invited to the AFL Draft Combine. Around this time he confirmed years of informal commitment, nominating for selection to Richmond under the father-son rule.

Prior to the draft, Rioli was forecast to land with Richmond at pick 47 and 52 by Fox Footy and ESPN in their respective phantom drafts. He was noted for his tackling ability, goal-sense and sprint speed.

AFL career

2021 season

He first represented Richmond as part of the club's reserves side, featuring in VFL pre-season matches from February through April when the season officially began. Rioli impressed over that time, first earning a place as a non-playing emergency in the club's round 5 AFL match against . Though he went unselected in the final team, he was a stand-out performer at reserves level, kicking two goals and recording 17 disposals in the opening round of the VFL season that same weekend. He was an AFL emergency regularly over the month that followed, while continuing to play VFL football as a small forward with occasional stints in the midfield. In May, Richmond senior coach Damien Hardwick labelled Rioli close to AFL selection, but said he would require a stronger endurance base before he could be named for a debut. Through the first week of July, he ranked second among midfield-forwards in the VFL with 5.8 tackles per game and was in contention for the league's goal of the year award with a 90-metre sprint goal against the Northern Bullants. Following an eight-tackle game against Frankston in early August, Rioli was elevated to senior level and named to make his AFL debut in a round 21 match against .

Player profile
Rioli plays primarily as a defensive small forward and is notable for his ability to apply forward-half pressure and create turnovers among opposition defenders.

Statistics
Updated to the end of round 23, 2022.

|-
| 2021
|  || 49 || 2 || 2 || 0 || 7 || 2 || 9 || 1 || 4 || 1.0 || 0.0 || 3.5 || 1.0 || 4.5 || 0.5 || 2.0
|- 
| 2022
|  || 49 || 14 || 13 || 6 || 69 || 41 || 110 || 26 || 37 || 0.9 || 0.4 || 4.9 || 2.9 || 7.9 || 1.9 || 2.6
|- class="sortbottom" 
! colspan=3| Career
! 16
! 15
! 6
! 76
! 43
! 119
! 27
! 41
! 0.9
! 0.4
! 4.8
! 2.7
! 7.4
! 1.7
! 2.6
|}

Personal life
He is the sixth in the Rioli family to play in the AFL, following his father Maurice, cousin Dean, cousin Cyril, nephew Daniel and cousin Willie.

References

External links

Maurice Rioli Jr.'s profile at AFL Draft Central

Living people
2002 births
Richmond Football Club players
St Mary's Football Club (NTFL) players
Australian rules footballers from the Northern Territory
People educated at Scotch College, Melbourne
Indigenous Australian players of Australian rules football
Rioli family
Tiwi Islands people